Baiju Parthan (born 1956 in Kerala), is a painter of intermedia art in India.

Curated by Ranjit Hoskote, Baiju Parthan: A User's Manual takes the reader on a tour through the artist's diversely populated imagination. It maps Parthan's journey from his childhood in Kerala, through his student years in Goa, to his struggle to find a niche in the contemporary Indian art scenario. This book records Parthan's participation in the last years of the countercultural hippie scene, his encounters with spiritual teachings and shamanic lore, his experiments with form, and his engagement with media flows and alternative reality environments.

Baiju Parthan: A User's Manual includes a monographic essay on the artist by Hoskote, as well as a freewheeling conversation between artist and author, extracts from Parthan's journal, a section on his intermedia works, a selection of the artist's occasional writings, and a biographical essay.

References

External links

baijuparthan.info
2004-05 exhibit, NRLA Midland 05 (Australia)

, Nancy Adajania

20th-century Indian painters
Indian contemporary painters
1956 births
Living people
Painters from Kerala